The following highways are numbered 71:

International
 Asian Highway 71
 European route E71

Afghanistan
Delaram-Zaranj Highway (A71)

Australia
 Anzac Avenue (Queensland)
  Mitchell Highway

Canada
 Newfoundland and Labrador Route 71
 Highway 71 (Ontario)

India
 National Highway 71 (India)

Iran
 Road 71

Israel
Highway 71 (Israel)

Korea, South
National Route 71

New Zealand
 State Highway 71 (New Zealand)

United Kingdom
 A71 road (Scotland)

United States
 Interstate 71
 U.S. Route 71
 Alabama State Route 71
 Arizona State Route 71
 California State Route 71
 Colorado State Highway 71
 Connecticut Route 71
 Connecticut Route 71A
 Delaware Route 71
 Florida State Road 71
 County Road 71A (Gulf County, Florida)
 Georgia State Route 71
 Idaho State Highway 71
 Illinois Route 71
 Indiana State Road 71
 K-71 (Kansas highway)
 Kentucky Route 71 (former)
 Louisiana State Route 71 (former)
 Maryland Route 71 (1927–1956) (former)
 Maryland Route 71 (1956–1959) (former)
 Massachusetts Route 71
 M-71 (Michigan highway)
 County Road 71 (Dakota County, Minnesota)
 County Road 71 (Ramsey County, Minnesota)
Missouri Route 71 (1922) (former)
 Nebraska Highway 71
 Nebraska Spur 71A
 Nebraska Spur 71B
 Nebraska Spur 71C
 Nebraska Spur 71F
 Nebraska Recreation Road 71G
 Nevada State Route 71 (former)
 New Jersey Route 71
 County Route 71 (Bergen County, New Jersey)
 County Route 71 (Ocean County, New Jersey)
 New York State Route 71
 County Route 71 (Chautauqua County, New York)
 County Route 71 (Dutchess County, New York)
 County Route 71 (Essex County, New York)
 County Route 71 (Herkimer County, New York)
 County Route 71 (Livingston County, New York)
 County Route 71 (Montgomery County, New York)
 County Route 71 (Oneida County, New York)
 County Route 71 (Putnam County, New York)
 County Route 71 (Rockland County, New York)
 County Route 71 (Saratoga County, New York)
 County Route 71 (Schenectady County, New York)
 County Route 71 (Suffolk County, New York)
 County Route 71 (Sullivan County, New York)
 County Route 71 (Warren County, New York)
 County Route 71 (Westchester County, New York)
 North Carolina Highway 71
 Ohio State Route 71 (1923) (former)
 Oklahoma State Highway 71
 Pennsylvania Route 71 (former)
 South Carolina Highway 71
 South Dakota Highway 71
 Tennessee State Route 71
 Texas State Highway 71
 Texas State Highway Loop 71
 Farm to Market Road 71
 Texas Park Road 71
 Utah State Route 71
 Virginia State Route 71
 West Virginia Route 71
 Wisconsin Highway 71
 Wyoming Highway 71

See also
A71 (disambiguation)